En concert avec l'Orchestre Lamoureux (In concert with the Lamoureux Orchestra) is the second live album by the French duo Les Rita Mitsouko. It was recorded live at the Théâtre des Champs-Élysées by Madje Malki and Laurent Gatignol.

Track listing

References

Les Rita Mitsouko albums
2004 live albums
Virgin Records live albums